I Wanna Touch You may refer to:
 I Wanna Touch You (album), a 2008 album by Merzedes Club, and the title song
 I Wanna Touch You (Ultrabeat song)
 I Wanna Touch You (Colby O'Donis song)